Red Card was the third and most successful studio album by the UK rock group Streetwalkers, which made the #20 in the UK album charts.  The album features the lineup of Roger Chapman, Charlie Whitney, Bobby Tench of The Jeff Beck Group and Hummingbird,  Nicko McBrain, who later played drums with Iron Maiden and bassist Jon Plotel. This groove heavy album  was released in the UK by Vertigo and in the United States by Mercury during 1976 and remains a much respected album by many.

Track listing
All tracks composed by Roger Chapman and John "Charlie" Whitney; except where indicated

Personnel 
Roger Chapman - lead and backing vocals, harmonica, percussion
Charlie Whitney - guitar, keyboards, slide guitar
Bob Tench (credited courtesy of A&M Records) - guitars, backing and lead vocals, keyboards, percussion
Jon Plotel - bass, backing vocals
Nicko McBrain - drums, percussion
Uncle Al's Pals Choir - choir and chorus
Wilfred Gibson - string arrangements on "Between Us"

Notes

References
Strong, Martin Charles and Peel, John. The great rock discography. Canongate US (2004). 7th edition. .
Tudor, Dean. Annual index to popular music record reviews. Scarecrow Press (1977). Digitized October 12, 2006. .

1976 albums
Streetwalkers albums
Mercury Records albums
Vertigo Records albums